Logi may refer to:

People
 Logi Bergmann Eiðsson (born 1966), Icelandic television host, news anchor and reporter
 Logi Geirsson (born 1982), Icelandic handball player
 Logi Gunnarsson (born 1981), Icelandic basketball player
 Logi Jes Kristjánsson (born 1972), Icelandic swimmer
 Logi Már Einarsson (born 1964), Icelandic politician and architect
 Logi Pedro (born 1992), Icelandic-Angolan musician and record producer
 Logi Ólafsson (born 1954), Icelandic football coach and player

Companies
 Logitech
 Logi Analytics

Other
 Logi (mythology), Norse deity of fire
 Logi Universe